Krčić Hydroelectric Power Plant is a hydroelectric power plant on river Krka, located in Šibenik-Knin County, in central Dalmatia, Croatia.

Krčić is classified by its operator Hrvatska elektroprivreda as a very small power plant, as its installed power is 0.35 MW and produces between 1 and 2 GWh per year. Constructed in 1988, it is located on the Krka River spring, under the Topolje waterfall in the Kovačići village, approximately 4.5 km northeast from Knin.

The Krka River catchment Hydropower structures
Golubić Hydroelectric Power Plant
 Krčić Hydroelectric Power Plant
Miljacka Hydroelectric Power Plant
Roški Slap Hydroelectric Power Plant
Jaruga Hydroelectric Power Plant

See also

Krka
Knin

References

Hydroelectric power stations in Croatia
Buildings and structures in Šibenik-Knin County